Nea-Stina Liljedahl (born 16 January 1993) is a Finnish footballer currently playing for FC Honka's women's team in the Naisten Liiga. She is a Finland under-19 international.

Liljedahl, who can play in midfield or defence, moved from HJK to FC Honka ahead of the 2013 season. Liljedahl had played in 81 league games for HJK, scoring eight goals. She acquired the nickname "Nekku" after a type of traditional Finnish confection which she had developed a fondness for.

Following an injury to Maija Saari, national coach Andrée Jeglertz's drafted the uncapped Liljedahl into his Finland squad for UEFA Women's Euro 2013.

References

External links
Profile at FC Honka Naiset

1993 births
Living people
Finnish women's footballers
Kansallinen Liiga players
Helsingin Jalkapalloklubi (women) players
FC Honka (women) players
Women's association football central defenders
Women's association football midfielders
Footballers from Helsinki
21st-century Finnish women